Kevin Clarke (3 December 1921 – November 1990) was a Dublin born former Irish soccer player.

He played for Drumcondra F.C. at club level where he won the FAI Cup twice. He then transferred to Swansea Town in November 1948. In season 1953-54 he joined Tunbridge Wells United

Clarke was capped twice by the Republic of Ireland national football team. He made his debut on 23 May 1948, in a 2–0 defeat to Portugal in a friendly international played in Lisbon. He played his only other senior international a week later in Barcelona, when Ireland were beaten 2-1 by Spain in another friendly international.

While with Drums he represented the League of Ireland six times.

Honours
 League of Ireland: 1
 Drumcondra F.C. 1947/48
 FAI Cup: 2
 Drumcondra F.C. 1943, 1946
English Third Division (South)
 Swansea Town 1948-49

References

Sources
 The Complete Who's Who of Irish International Football, 1945-96 (1996):Stephen McGarrigle [2]

1921 births
1990 deaths
Association footballers from Dublin (city)
Republic of Ireland association footballers
Republic of Ireland international footballers
Ireland (FAI) international footballers
League of Ireland players
Drumcondra F.C. players
Tunbridge Wells F.C. players
Swansea City A.F.C. players
English Football League players
League of Ireland XI players
Association football midfielders